The 1952 United States Senate election in Montana took place on November 4, 1952. Incumbent United States Senator Zales Ecton, who was first elected to the Senate in 1946, ran for re-election. Ecton won the Republican primary uncontested, and advanced to the general election, where he faced Mike Mansfield, the United States Congressman from Montana's 1st congressional district and the Democratic nominee. Following a close campaign, Mansfield narrowly defeated Ecton, winning his first of several terms in the Senate.

Democratic primary

Candidates
Mike Mansfield, United States Congressman from Montana's 1st congressional district

Results

Republican primary

Candidates
Zales Ecton, incumbent United States Senator

Results

General election

Results

References

Montana
1952
1952 Montana elections